The 455th Air Expeditionary Wing was a provisional United States Air Force unit formerly located at Bagram Airfield, Afghanistan.  It was one of two expeditionary wings in Afghanistan. Most wing personnel were located at the Air Force Village known as Camp Cunningham.

The first predecessor of the wing was organized in 1943 as the 455th Bombardment Group.  After training in the United States with Consolidated B-24 Liberator bombers, the 455th deployed to the Mediterranean Theater of Operations, participating in the strategic bombing campaign against Germany.   It earned two Distinguished Unit Citations for its combat operations.  Following V-E Day, it remained in Italy without its flight echelon until inactivating in September 1945.

The group was activated in the reserve in 1947. Apparently, it was not fully manned or equipped before inactivating in June 1949 and transferring most of its resources to another unit.  It was redesignated the 445th Fighter-Day Group and activated in 1956, but did not become operational before inactivating in July 1957.

The wing's second predecessor was established in 1953, but not organized until November 1962 as the 455th Strategic Missile Wing an LGM-30B Minuteman I wing. It was inactivated in June 1968 and transferred its assets to the 91st Strategic Missile Wing.  The group and wing were consolidated in 1985.  In 2001, the consolidated unit was converted to provisional status as the 455th Air Expeditionary Group.  It was activated the following year.

Mission
The wing's primary mission was to support the Global War on Terrorism by providing aerial support for U.S. and Coalition forces on the ground.  Activated in 2002, the 455th had members deployed throughout the country supporting Operation Enduring Freedom.

The wing commander reported to the United States Air Forces Central Command commander in Southwest Asia. The commander was supported by a wing staff and oversaw five Air Force groups located at Bagram and one at Kandahar Airfield. The five groups were the 455th Expeditionary Operations Group, the 455th Expeditionary Maintenance Group, the 455th Expeditionary Mission Support Group, 455th Expeditionary Medical Group, and the 455th Expeditionary Base Defense Group.  It also oversaw the 451st Air Expeditionary Group at Kandahar Airfield.

Units
The wing consists of five groups:

 455th Expeditionary Operations Group.  The group is responsible for all expeditionary flying and aeromedical evacuation operations for the wing. It oversees operations of a General Dynamics F-16 Fighting Falcon close air support squadron, a Lockheed C-130 Hercules airlift squadron, a Sikorsky HH-60 Pave Hawk/Guardian Angel rescue squadron, a Lockheed EC-130H Compass Call electronic combat squadron and an aeromedical evacuation flight. It also oversees support functions such as air traffic control, intelligence, weather, radar monitoring and landing systems, airfield management and command and control equipment at forward-operating bases.
 83d Expeditionary Rescue Squadron (Boeing CH-47 Chinook)
 774th Expeditionary Airlift Squadron (Lockheed C-130 Hercules)
 41st Expeditionary Electronic Combat Squadron (Lockheed EC-130H Compass Call)
 Rotational Expeditionary Fighter Squadron (General Dynamics F-16 Fighting Falcon)
 555th Expeditionary Fighter Squadron April–October 2015
 421st Expeditionary Fighter Squadron October 2015 – April 2016.

 457th Expeditionary Fighter Squadron April–October 2016.
 93d Expeditionary Fighter Squadron April–October 2016.
 79th Expeditionary Fighter Squadron October 2016 – April 2017.
 555th Expeditionary Fighter Squadron April–October 2017
 77th Expeditionary Fighter Squadron October 2017 – April 2018

 455th Expeditionary Mission Support Group.  The group provides services in support of coalition forces throughout Afghanistan. It is composed of five squadrons responsible for communications, civil engineer operations, force support, logistics readiness, and security forces.

 455th Expeditionary Aerial Port Squadron
 455th Expeditionary Civil Engineer Squadron
 455th Expeditionary Communications Squadron
 455th Expeditionary Force Support Squadron
 455th Expeditionary Logistics Readiness Squadron
 455th Expeditionary Security Forces Squadron

 455th Expeditionary Maintenance Group.  The group provides combat-ready aircraft and munitions in support of coalition forces throughout Afghanistan. The group comprises two squadrons responsible for on- and off-aircraft maintenance and sortie generation of F-15E, F-16 and C-130 aircraft, as well as launch, recovery, and servicing support for military and commercial transient aircraft.
 455th Expeditionary Maintenance Squadron
 455th Expeditionary Aircraft Maintenance Squadron
 455th Expeditionary Medical Group. The group is the Air Force component for Task Force Med, which provides combat medical and combat medical support services to U.S. and coalition forces throughout Afghanistan. Along with the U.S. Army, the group staffs Craig Joint Theater Hospital at Bagram.
 455th Expeditionary Medical Operations Squadron
 455th Expeditionary Medical Support Squadron
 451st Air Expeditionary Group: The group operates the Northrop Grumman E-11, General Atomics MQ-1 Predator, and General Atomics MQ-9 Reaper at Kandahar and Jalalabad Airfields.

History

World War II

Training in the United States
The group was first activated at Alamogordo Army Air Field, New Mexico on 1 June 1943 as the 445th Bombardment Group, with the 740th, 741st, 742d and 743d Bombardment Squadrons assigned. The initial cadre for the group was drawn from the 302d Bombardment Group.  In July, a cadre was given advanced tactical training by the Army Air Forces School of Applied Tactics at Orlando Army Air Base and Pinecastle Army Air Field, Florida.  After organizing at Alamogordo, the group moved to Utah, where the ground echelon was stationed at Kearns Army Air Base, although flying operations were based at Salt Lake City Army Air Base. After completing training at Langley Field, Virginia, the group departed the United States for the Mediterranean Theater of Operations in December 1943. The air echelon began staging through Mitchel Field, New York to ferry their Liberators via the southern ferry route. The ground echelon of group headquarters sailed on the SS William T. Barry.

Combat operations

The air echelon of the group was delayed in Tunisia and was not entirely lodged at the 455th's combat station of San Giovanni Airfield, Italy until 1 February 1944, and the group flew its first mission on 16 February. The group was engaged primarily in the strategic bombing campaign against Germany, attacking targets like airfields, factories, oil refineries, harbors, marshalling yards in Italy, France, Germany, Austria, Hungary, Romania, and Yugoslavia.

On 2 April 1944, the group attacked a ball-bearing plant at Steyr, Austria for which it earned a Distinguished Unit Citation (DUC).  The primary target, the Daimler-Pusch aircraft engine factory was obscured by clouds, so the unit attacked the nearby ball bearing plant although attacks by an estimated 75 twin-engine fighters continued through the bomb run and heavy, accurate flak was encountered.  The 740th claimed the destruction of seven of these fighters against the loss of one squadron Liberator.   The 742d lost two Liberators in the attack but claimed the destruction of six enemy aircraft.  Five crewmembers from one of the squadron's B-24s lost in the attack bailed out in territory controlled by Yugoslav Partisans and were able to evade German forces and returned to the squadron a month after the attack.  The 743d Squadron claimed the destruction of nine fighters against the loss of two squadron Liberators.

On 26 June 1944, the group, which was leading the 304th Bombardment Wing on the raid, encountered fighter opposition that was described as the strongest Fifteenth Air Force had encountered to date, and which destroyed several Liberators of the 455th Group.  One 740th Liberator was lost on the raid, while the squadron claimed eleven enemy aircraft destroyed (two shared claims).    Enemy fighters were able to separate the 741st Squadron from its fighter escort and intensified their attacks on the squadron.  One 741st bomber was lost when a Luftwaffe fighter dove head-on into it.  The Liberator continued on the bomb run and dropped its bombs on the target before crashing into the ground. Other fighters continued their attacks to within 100 feet of the group's planes.  On this mission, the 742d Squadron suffered its heaviest losses of the war, with six planes lost to enemy action.  Only one of the squadron's Liberators that reached the target returned safely.  The 743d Squadron put nine bombers over the target but was the only squadron of the group to bring all its planes home.  The group pressed its attack on an oil refinery at Moosbierbaum, Austria, for which it received a second DUC.

The group provided air support to ground forces in Operation Shingle, the landings at Anzio and the Battle of Monte Cassino in the spring of 1944.  It knocked out coastal defenses to clear the way for Operation Dragoon, the invasion of southern France in September.  As Axis forces were withdrawing from the Balkan peninsula in the fall of 1944, the squadron bombed marshalling yards, troop concentrations and airfields to slow their retreat.  It flew air interdiction missions to support Operation Grapeshot, the Spring 1945 offensive in Northern Italy.

The group flew its last combat mission on 25 April 1945 against rail yards at Linz, Austria. Following the surrender of German forces in Italy, it flew some supply missions and transported personnel to ports and airfields for shipment back to the United States.  Most of the air echelon returned to the United States, ferrying their aircraft in June.  The 740th Squadron's ground personnel moved to Bari Airfield in July 1945, where they serviced the aircraft assigned to headquarters, Fifteenth Air Force.   Many of the group's remaining personnel were transferred to other units in the 304th Bombardment Wing for shipment back to the United States, while the group remained in Italy, serving as a replacement depot.  The last of the air echelon departed Italy in July and the group was inactivated on 9 September 1945.

The group lost 118 aircraft. It suffered 147 killed in action, 268 Missing in action, 179 prisoners of war, and 169 wounded in action. On the other hand, the group claimed the destruction of 119 enemy aircraft.

Air Force reserve
The group was reactivated as a reserve unit under Air Defense Command (ADC) in March 1947 at Hensley Field, Texas, with the 740th Squadron, which was already active, assigned to it. At Hensley its training was supervised by ADC's 4122d AAF Base Unit (later the 2596th Air Force Reserve Training Center).  The 741st and 742d Squadrons were activated to join the group in late June and early September 1947, respectively. In October, the group was rounded out with the activation of the 743d Squadron, which was not stationed with the group, but at Sheppard-Kell Municipal Airport. The 455th was nominally a very heavy bomber unit, but does not appear to have been fully manned or equipped while a reserve unit. In 1948 Continental Air Command (ConAC) assumed responsibility for managing reserve and Air National Guard units from ADC. President Truman's reduced 1949 defense budget required reductions in the number of units in the Air Force. ConAC also reorganized its reserve units under the wing base organization system in June 1949.  As a result, the group was inactivated and its personnel and equipment at Hensley Field were transferred to elements of the 443d Troop Carrier Wing, which was activated simultaneously. The 743d Squadron was also inactivated and reserve flying operations at Sheppard came to an end.

Tactical Air Command
The group was redesignated the 455th Fighter-Day Group and activated at Myrtle Beach Air Force Base, South Carolina in July 1956 as Tactical Air Command planned to organize a second North American F-100 Super Sabre wing there. Some personnel were assigned to the group and its squadrons, but it never became operational with aircraft.   It was inactivated in July 1957 and its few personnel were reassigned to elements of the 354th Fighter-Day Wing.

Intercontinental ballistic missile wing
The wing's second predecessor was organized at Minot Air Force Base, North Dakota in November 1962 as the 455th Strategic Missile Wing along with its 740th Squadron. The 741st and 742d Squadrons were organized in December 1962 and January 1963. The wing prepared for operational capability with LGM-30B Minuteman I missiles through March 1964.  The wing's first Minuteman missile arrived on 6 September 1963, and was placed three days later. The 150th, and final, missile was placed on 26 February 1964, and by late March the wing became combat-ready.

On 25 June 1968, the 455th was inactivated and transferred its assets to the 91st Strategic Missile Wing, which moved to Minot on paper from Glasgow Air Force Base, Montana.  The three missile squadrons, however, were reassigned to the 91st Wing.

On 31 January 1984, the 455th Fighter-Day Group and the 455th Strategic Missile Wing were consolidated into a single unit under the wing's designation.

War in Afghanistan

The 455th was converted to provisional status in December 2001 and redesignated the 455th Air Expeditionary Group for the Global War on Terrorism.  It was activated on 26 April 2002 at Bagram Air Base.  In July 2002, the group was redesignated the 455th Air Expeditionary Wing with five assigned groups. Since then the wing has provided close air support, air mobility, intelligence, surveillance, reconnaissance, combat search and rescue, electronic attack, aero medical evacuation, and combat support as the lead Air Force organization in Afghanistan. The wing consisted of about 1,600 airmen, based throughout Afghanistan.

The 455 AEW was awarded the Meritorious Unit Award for all personnel assigned between 1 October 2006 and 30 September 2007, 1 October 2008 through 30 September 2009, and 1 October 2010 through 30 September 2011.

Lineage
 455th Fighter-Day Group
 Constituted as the 455th Bombardment Group (Heavy) on 14 May 1943
 Activated on 1 June 1943
 Redesignated 455th Bombardment Group, Heavy on 6 March 1944
 Inactivated on 9 September 1945
 Redesignated 455th Bombardment Group, Very Heavy on 5 March 1947
 Activated on 25 March 1947
 Inactivated on 27 June 1949
 Redesignated 455th Fighter-Day Group on 7 May 1956
 Activated on 25 July 1956
 Inactivated 1 July 1957
 Consolidated with the 455th Strategic Missile Wing as the 455th Strategic Missile Wing on 31 January 1984

455th Air Expeditionary Wing
 Established as the 455th Fighter-Bomber Wing on 23 March 1953
 Redesignated 455th Strategic Missile Wing (ICBM—Minuteman) and activated on 28 June 1962 (not organized)
 Organized on 1 November 1962
 Discontinued and inactivated on 25 June 1968
 Consolidated with the 455th Fighter-Day Group on 31 January 1984
 Converted to provisional status and redesignated 455th Air Expeditionary Group on 4 December 2001 and assigned to Air Combat Command to activate or inactivate as needed
 Activated on 26 April 2002
 Redesignated 455th Air Expeditionary Wing on 26 July 2002

Assignments
 II Bomber Command, 1 June 1943
 I Bomber Command, 4 October 1943
 Fifteenth Air Force, c. 15 January 1944
 304th Bombardment Wing, 25 January 1944 – 9 September 1945
 Tenth Air Force, 25 March 1947
 309th Bombardment Wing (later 309th Air Division), 17 October 1947 – 27 June 1949
 Ninth Air Force, 25 July 1956 – 1 July 1957 (attached to 342d Fighter-Day Wing until 19 November 1956, then to 354th Fighter-Day Wing)
 Strategic Air Command, 28 June 1962 (not organized)
 810th Strategic Aerospace Division, 1 November 1962 – 25 June 1968
 Air Combat Command to activate or inactivate as needed, 4 December 2001
 9th Aerospace Expeditionary Task Force, 26 July 2002 – July 2021

Stations
 Alamogordo Army Air Field, New Mexico, 1 June 1943
 Kearns Army Air Field, Utah, c. 6 September 1943
 Langley Field, Virginia, c. 5 October – 2 December 1943
 San Giovanni Airfield, Italy, 15 January 1944 – 9 September 1945
 Hensley Field, Texas, 25 March 1947 – 27 June 1949
 Myrtle Beach Air Force Base, South Carolina, 25 July 1956 – 1 July 1957
 Minot Air Force Base, North Dakota, 1 November 1962 – 25 June 1968
 Bagram Airfield, Afghanistan, 26 April 2002 – Jul 2021

Components
 Groups
 451st Air Expeditionary Group, 1 April 2014 – present
 455th Expeditionary Operations Group, 26 July 2002 – present
 455th Expeditionary Logistics Group (later 455th Expeditionary Maintenance Group), c. 26 July 2002 – present
 455th Expeditionary Medical Group, c. 26 July 2002 – present
 455th Expeditionary Support Group (later 455th Expeditionary Mission Support Group), c. 26 July 2002 – present
 755th Expeditionary Mission Support Group (later 755th Air Expeditionary Group), 17 January 2006 – present

 Squadrons
 740th Bombardment Squadron (later 740th Fighter-Day Squadron, 740th Strategic Missile Squadron): 1 June 1943 – 9 September 1945, 25 March 1947 – 27 June 1949, 25 July 1956 – 1 July 1957, 1 December 1962 – 25 June 1968
 741st Bombardment Squadron (later 741st Fighter-Day Squadron, 741st Strategic Missile Squadron): 1 June 1943 – 9 September 1945, 26 June 1947 – 27 June 1949, 25 July 1956 – 1 July 1957, 1 December 1962 – 25 June 1968
 742d Bombardment Squadron (later 742d Fighter-Day Squadron, 743d Strategic Missile Squadron): 1 June 1943 – 9 September 1945, 9 September 1947 – 27 June 1949, 25 July 1956 – 1 July 1957, 1 January 1963 – 25 June 1968
 743d Bombardment Squadron: 1 June 1943 – 9 September 1945, 15 October 1947 – 27 June 1949

Aircraft and missiles

 Consolidated B-24 Liberator, 1943–1945
 Boeing LGM-30B Minuteman I (1962–1968)
 Fairchild Republic A-10 Thunderbolt II (2002–2020)
 Grumman EA-6B Prowler (since 2003)
 Lockheed EC-130H Compass Call (since 2003)
 McDonnell Douglas F-15E Strike Eagle (since 2007)
 General Dynamics F-16 Fighting Falcon (2009-2021)
 Sikorsky HH-60 Pave Hawk (since 2003)
 Lockheed C-130J Hercules (since 2008)
 Lockheed C-130H Hercules (since 2003)
 General Atomics MQ-1 Predator (since 2003)
 Beechcraft MC-12W Huron (since 2009)
 Northrop Grumman E-11 (since 2014)
 General Atomics MQ-9 Reaper (since 2014)

Awards and campaigns

See also
 List of missile wings of the United States Air Force
 B-24 Liberator units of the United States Army Air Forces
 Liberator airplane crash near Sveta Trojica

References

Bibliography

 
 
 
 
 
 
World Airpower Journal. (1992). US Air Force Air Power Directory. Aerospace Publishing: London, UK. 

 Further reading

Notes
 Explanatory notes

 Citations

External links
 
 455th AEW Official factsheet
455th SMW – StrategicAirCommand.com
Minot AFB Minuteman Missile Site Coordinates

0455
Military units and formations disestablished in the 2020s